Craig Martin Connell (born 7 September 1967) is a New Zealand former cyclist. He competed in the team pursuit event at the 1988 Summer Olympics. In 1990, Connell was awarded the New Zealand 1990 Commemoration Medal.

References

External links
 

1967 births
Living people
New Zealand male cyclists
Olympic cyclists of New Zealand
Cyclists at the 1988 Summer Olympics
Cyclists from Auckland
Commonwealth Games medallists in cycling
Commonwealth Games silver medallists for New Zealand
Cyclists at the 1990 Commonwealth Games
20th-century New Zealand people
Medallists at the 1990 Commonwealth Games